Sunay Bulut (born 1 December 1967) is a Turkish weightlifter. He competed at the 1992 Summer Olympics and the 1996 Summer Olympics.

References

1967 births
Living people
Turkish male weightlifters
Olympic weightlifters of Turkey
Weightlifters at the 1992 Summer Olympics
Weightlifters at the 1996 Summer Olympics
Sportspeople from Plovdiv
World Weightlifting Championships medalists
20th-century Turkish people